Commercial Block may refer to:

Commercial Block (Fairfield, Iowa), listed on the National Register of Historic Places in Jefferson County, Iowa
Commercial Block (Spokane, Washington), listed on the National Register of Historic Places in Spokane County, Washington